David Harris (born June 18, 1959), also known as David D. Harris, is an American television and film actor, most notable for his portrayal of Cochise, a young gang member, in the 1979 film The Warriors. He has appeared as a supporting actor in a number of films and television series, and commonly plays police officers and military personnel.

His first role came in the 1976 television film Judge Horton and the Scottsboro Boys, in which he co-starred as Haywood Patterson. He followed this up with a number of supporting roles until 1979, when he appeared as Cochise in The Warriors, the role for which he is best remembered. He also appeared in the Robert Redford film Brubaker the following year. Throughout the 1980s, he appeared in a number of fairly high-profile films, and in the 1990s, he did mostly television work. He lent his voice to The Warriors video game in 2005, reprising his role as Cochise. In 2012, he appeared in Law & Order: Special Victims Unit as Warden.

Filmography

Film

Television

Video games

References

External links
 
 

1959 births
Living people
Male actors from New York City
American male film actors
African-American male actors
American male television actors
21st-century African-American people
20th-century African-American people